John Gibbs Churchill  (7 February 1905–2 December 1975) was a New Zealand trade unionist and local politician. For six years he was the mayor of Otaki.

Biography

Early life and career
Churchill was born 7 February 1905 in Wellington. He was educated at Terrace School and then Wellington College. In 1929 he married Hilda Kate Barley. That same year he entered employment with the New Zealand Post Office as a Mechanician. He rose to become a Senior Mechanician and then a Departmental Welfare Officer.

He was a leading figure in the New Zealand Post Office and Telegraph Association. In 1937 he was elected on to the executive of the association and two years later was elected as Vice-President. He then served as its President from 1943 to 1946 when he resigned to take up a position on the association's permanent staff as associate secretary. He later became General Secretary of the association from 1958 to 1964 when he retired.

Political career

In 1950 Churchill won a seat on the Wellington City Council on a Labour ticket which he was to hold until 1964 when he decided not stand for re-election. He had twice stood for the council previously but been unsuccessful. In 1957 Churchill suggested to the Town Clerk that the council design a flag for the city for official occasions and to be flown at civic buildings, parks and reserves. His suggestion was approved by the city's Public Relations & Cultural Committee leading to the City Council to subsequently adopt the idea of a city flag. The local newspaper The Evening Post were also enthusiastic for a city flag and, after a long period of public design submissions, one was found to be favourable by the City Council and the design was officially adopted as the flag of Wellington City in 1963. He became leader of the Labour members on the council and was twice nominated for the position of deputy mayor. He lost in a ballot among fellow councillors to Harry Nankervis after the 1959 elections and again in 1962 to Denis McGrath (both from the Citizens' Association which held majorities on the council). He suffered a heart attack in 1963, which contributed to his decision to retire from the city council. The council decided against holding a by-election to fill the vacancy caused by his retirement and his vacated seat remained empty until the 1965 elections.

He stood for the Wellington Harbour Board unsuccessfully in 1956, polling higher than any other unsuccessful candidate. When a vacancy occurred on the board following the death of Sir Will Appleton, Churchill was expected to be awarded the vacated seat. However, he was defeated in a ballot of councillors eight votes to seven in favour of Nesbit Douglas Binnie (former general manager of Port Line) despite Binnie not having contested the previous election. Later an allegation surfaced that Citizens' Association members had met privately the morning before and had been influenced on nominating Binnie over Churchill. Churchill was later elected to the Harbour Board in 1962, remaining a member until 1971 when he was defeated. Despite leaving Wellington, he was elected to serve on the board in his final three terms as a representative for Wellington, the first person outside the city to represent it on that body.

He and his wife moved to Ōtaki in 1965 and in 1967 he was elected to the Otaki Borough Council in a by-election. In 1969 he stood for the mayoralty unopposed. He was similarly re-elected in the next two elections unopposed. He served as Mayor of Otaki until his death in 1975.

Later life and death
In the 1965 Queen's Birthday Honours, Churchill was appointed an Officer of the Order of the British Empire, in recognition of his service as general secretary of the Post Office Association. In May 1974, he was appointed to the board of the Wellington Savings Bank by the Third Labour Government.

Churchill died at his home in Ōtaki on 2 December 1975 aged 70. He was survived by his wife, son and five grandchildren.

Honorific eponym
Churchill Park, located in Seatoun, was named after him in recognition of his many years as chairman of the Wellington City Council Reserves Committee. The now demolished Churchill Park in Ōtaki was likewise named after Churchill.

Publications by Churchill

Notes

References

1905 births
1975 deaths
People educated at Wellington College (New Zealand)
New Zealand trade unionists
Mayors of places in Manawatū-Whanganui
Wellington City Councillors
Wellington Harbour Board members
New Zealand Labour Party politicians
New Zealand justices of the peace
New Zealand Officers of the Order of the British Empire
20th-century New Zealand politicians